The Shakin' Pyramids is a compilation album from the Scottish Neo-Rockabilly group The Shakin' Pyramids, released shortly after the group's disbandment in 1983 by Rock 'n Roll Records, a Scotti Brothers Records subsidiary. The album features ten tracks: five from their 1981 debut album, Skin 'Em Up, and five from their second and final album, Celts and Cobras, released in 1982. Although normally billed as a trio, live and session bassist Dave Rivett joins the band on the album cover.

Track listing
Side A:
"Take A Trip"
"Tennessee Rock 'n' Roll"
"Teenage Boogie"
"Alright Alnight"
"Cry Cry Kitten"

Side B:
"Pharaoh's Chant"
"Quit and Split"
"Just Rockin'"
"I Got A Baby"
"Pretty Neat Come On"
"Let's Go"

Personnel 
Davie Duncan – lead vocals
James G. Creighton – guitar, background vocals
"Railroad" Ken McLellan – guitar, background vocals
Dave Rivett – bass guitar

References

1983 compilation albums
The Shakin' Pyramids albums
Rock 'n Roll Records albums